Shahrvand (Persian:  شهروند) is the largest Persian language newspaper in North America, which serves the Iranian and Afghan communities across North America.

Shahrvand has been published since 1991. Shahrvand is published weekly on Thursdays with distribution through Iranian businesses as well as community arts/cultural/entertainment events.  Shahrvand has introduced weekly arts and cultural listings provided in partnership with Toronto’s NOW magazine.

Features
Shahrvand regularly features:
 Current affairs
 Business news
 Sports
 Science and Technology news
 Entertainment
 Literature
 Crossword Puzzles

Distribution
Distributed free of charge to the community in the following areas:
 Ontario: Greater Toronto Area, Ottawa, London, Hamilton and Windsor
 Quebec: Montreal
 Alberta: Edmonton and Calgary
 United States: Houston, Dallas, Seattle, Los Angeles, San Francisco and San Diego

Demographic information

There are over 450,000 Persian speakers populating Canada; roughly 150,000 live in Southern Ontario, particularly in the GTA (Greater Toronto Area).

Circulation
With a weekly circulation of 14,000 in Toronto and an estimated readership of 110,000 Shahrvand provides an editorial platform, very much aware of the informational needs and requirements of the many Persian-speaking immigrants in North America. Shahrvand Publications is headquartered in Toronto, Ontario; and has affiliate offices across Canada, the United States, and Germany.

Shahrvand has a network of journalists and contributing editors stationed in the Middle East, Europe and North America.

English edition

A summary of the Persian language Thursday edition of Shahrvand is published in English on the website and is targeted to second generation Canadians of Iranian descent, as well as those who display an interest in Iranian culture.

References

External links
Official Website of Shahrvand (English & Persian)

Publications established in 1991
Iranian-Canadian culture
Iranian-Canadian organizations
Persian-language newspapers
Companies based in Toronto
Newspapers published in Toronto
Multicultural and ethnic newspapers published in Canada
Weekly newspapers published in Ontario
1991 establishments in Ontario